Good Gracious! is an album by jazz saxophonist Lou Donaldson recorded for the Blue Note label in 1963 and performed by Donaldson with Grant Green, Big John Patton, and Ben Dixon.

Reception
The album was awarded 3½ stars in an Allmusic review by Stephen Thomas Erlewine who states "Donaldson's tone is richer and fuller than it is on many of his early-'60s records, and he really connects with the laid-back R&B grooves and soul-jazz vamps on Good Gracious, turning in melodic, memorable solos... Good Gracious still falls prey to some of the lazy tempos that pop up on most Lou Donaldson records, but it remains one of his finest soul-jazz sessions". The Penguin Guide to Jazz Recordings describes the album as one of Donaldson’s best, in part because of the contributions from Patton and Green.

Track listing
All compositions are written by Lou Donaldson, except where noted.

Personnel
Lou Donaldson - alto saxophone
Grant Green - guitar
Big John Patton - organ
Ben Dixon - drums

References

Lou Donaldson albums
1964 albums
Albums produced by Alfred Lion
Blue Note Records albums
Albums recorded at Van Gelder Studio